The St. Mary's Church, Negombo is landmark edifice, a Roman Catholic church in the heart of Negombo. It is one of the largest cathedrals in Sri Lanka.

Location
St. Mary's Church is located in the Grand Street in the centre of Negombo.

History
Negombo has been influenced greatly by the Christian faith from the time it was occupied by the Portuguese. It is often called "Little Rome" in view of the large number of churches in the city.

Construction of the church was started in 1874 and completed, after a long gap, in 1922. The art and architecture of this church and a few similar other churches in Sri Lanka demonstrate the cultural amalgamation of the European practice with Sri Lankan art and architecture during the early years of the 20th century.

Features
The church was built in neoclassicism style with columns and plain walls. Its ceilings are painted with alabaster images of many saints. The walls at the upper level are fixed with sculptures of religious saints. The unique paintings on the life of Christ on the ceiling were done by the N.S. Godamanne, a local Buddhist painter. The beauty of the paintings on the nave is described as "thunderous". A testator paid the cost of one of the altars, which was imported from Europe.

References

Bibliography

Roman Catholic churches in Sri Lanka
Tourist attractions in Western Province, Sri Lanka
Churches in Negombo
Roman Catholic churches completed in 1924
20th-century Roman Catholic church buildings